William Coleman (1934–1988) was a distinguished historian of science with a core interest in the history of zoology and evolutionary theory. Coleman also studied the relationship between science and social and political schools of theory. The William Coleman Dissertation Fellowship is named in his honor.

Career

Coleman was a distinguished professor in his field. During the course of his career he taught at both Johns Hopkins University (1961–1978) and achieved the title of Professor of History of Science and Humanistic Studies. In 1971, Coleman received a fellowship from the American Council of Learned Societies and spent a year at the Institute for Research in the Humanities at the University of Wisconsin-Madison. Although he ultimately returned to Johns Hopkins University when his fellowship ended, Coleman was awarded a second fellowship in 1977 from the National Endowment for the Humanities, and again returned to the Institute for Research in the Humanities at the University of Wisconsin-Madison. In the culmination of his career, Coleman left Johns Hopkins University and began teaching at the University of Wisconsin-Madison (1978-1988). In 1978, the University of Wisconsin- Madison, appointed Coleman the title Professor of the History of Science and History of Medicine, and in 1984, Coleman received the honor of being named the Carol Dickson Bascom Professor in the Humanities. Professor Coleman served as president of the History of Science Society and was elected to the American Philosophical Society.

William Coleman Dissertation Fellowship
William Coleman died 28 April 1988, from Leukemia. In honor of his memory his widow, Louise S. Coleman, established the William Coleman Dissertation Fellowship in the History of Science at the Institute for Research in the Humanities located at the University of Wisconsin-Madison. The Coleman Dissertation Fellowship provides a one-semester stipend, currently assessed at $9,653, in addition to a tuition waiver and benefits, with additional printing, fax and photocopying privileges.

Publications
 George Cuvier, Zoologist. A Study in the History of Evolutionary Theory (1964)
 Biology in the Nineteenth Century: Problems of Form, Function and Transformation (1971)
 Death is a Social Disease: Public Health and Political Economy in Early Industrial France (1982)
 Yellow Fever in the North (1987)

References

1934 births
1988 deaths
20th-century American historians
20th-century American male writers
American historians of science
American male non-fiction writers